The Rush is a song by American recording R&B artist Luther Vandross', released as the third single from his 1991 album, Power of Love. It reached number six on the US R&B Singles chart and peaked at number 73 on Billboard's Hot 100 in January 1992. The next single to follow was "Sometimes It's Only Love".

Critical reception
Stephen Thomas Erlewine from AllMusic picked the song as one of the "high points" of the album. Larry Flick from Billboard wrote, "Vandross is sinfully sweet, slick, and sexy—as always. Urgent, moody R&B tune features upbeat drums that keeps the pace rocking, while the melody evokes mystery and passion." A reviewer from Cashbox picked it as one of the "strongest" songs on the album, describing it as "smooth yet funky". The magazine later stated, "It’s Luther, it’s a hit! To this date, Luther Vandross has been turning out nothing but hits, and this one is no exception." They added, "You have to give him some credit for changing his musical style on “The Rush”, because this single has a completely different sound compared to his previous productions (and it sounds good). It's needless to write about his vocals because everyone knows about this man's lyrical talent. Just mark down another hit.." Ken Tucker from Entertainment Weekly noted that songs like this "describe the sort of openness, understatement, and spontaneity that have virtually disappeared as pop-music values since the death of Marvin Gaye and Al Green's decision to save his soul for gospel."

Track listing
 US CD single
"The Rush" (Morales Radio Mix) — 3:57
"The Rush" (Morales 12" Mix) — 7:13
"The Rush" (Morales Rush Dub) — 7:10
"The Rush" (Vibe Rush Dub) — 5:13

Charts

Weekly charts

Year-end charts

References

External links
 luthervandross.com

1991 singles
Luther Vandross songs
1991 songs
Songs written by Luther Vandross
Epic Records singles
Songs written by Marcus Miller